Daniel Goodard is a British slalom canoeist who competed in the 2000s. He won a bronze medal in the C-1 team event at the 2006 ICF Canoe Slalom World Championships in Prague.

References

British male canoeists
Living people
Year of birth missing (living people)
Medalists at the ICF Canoe Slalom World Championships